The 2021 Texas Tech Red Raiders football team represented Texas Tech University during the 2021 NCAA Division I FBS football season. The Red Raiders play their home games at the Jones AT&T Stadium in Lubbock, Texas, and compete in the Big 12 Conference. With a 41–38 win over Iowa State on November 13, Texas Tech became bowl eligible for the first time since the 2017 season. The team finished the season with an overall record of 7–6 for the Red Raiders' first winning season since 2015.

The team was led by third-year head coach Matt Wells for the first eight games. Wells was fired on October 25, with offensive coordinator Sonny Cumbie being named interim head coach. Baylor associate head coach/outside linebackers coach Joey McGuire was named as Texas Tech's 17th head coach on November 8; Cumbie continued to serve as interim head coach for the remainder of the season. On November 24, McGuire announced that he would be retaining Cumbie as offensive coordinator and quarterbacks coach. However, on November 30, it was announced that Cumbie would become the head coach at Louisiana Tech; Cumbie would coach Texas Tech for its bowl game.

Following the regular season, kicker Jonathan Garibay was elected to the All-Big 12 Football First Team, while wide receiver Erik Ezukanma, offensive lineman Dawson Deaton, linebacker Colin Schooler, defensive back DaMarcus Fields, and punter Austin McNamara were selected to the second team.

Previous season

The Red Raiders finished the 2020 regular season 4–6 and 3–6 in Big 12 play to finish eighth in the conference. They were not eligible to play in post season play. Offensive coordinator David Yost was fired after the season and replaced by Sonny Cumbie.

Preseason

Award watch lists
Listed in the order that they were released

Big 12 media days
The Big 12 Media Days were held on July 14–15, 2021 at AT&T Stadium in Arlington, Texas. Texas Tech was represented by head coach Matt Wells, offensive lineman Dawson Deaton, and linebacker Riko Jeffers.

Big 12 media poll

Preseason All-Big 12 team
The 2021 Preseason All-Big 12 Team was announced on July 7, with three Texas Tech players being selected.

Schedule 

Schedule Source:

Coaching staff

Roster

Game summaries

vs. Houston (Texas Kickoff)

This was Texas Tech's second appearance in the Texas Kickoff game, with the team's first appearance being a 27–47 loss to Ole Miss in 2018.

Houston received the opening kickoff, starting the drive at its own 25-yard line. The Cougars would drive down the field, capping the drive off with a 1-yard run from Clayton Tune. On the ensuing kickoff, Houston attempted an onside kick and recovered it. The Cougars would score another touchdown, this time with a 23-yard pass from Tune to Nathaniel Dell to go up 14–0 following Dalton Witherspoon's kick. The Cougars would kick it off this time, giving Texas Tech's offense its first drive of the game. The Red Raiders made it down to the Houston 2-yard line, but running back Xavier White fumbled the ball and was recovered by Donavan Mutin for Houston. Houston would go three-and-out on its next drive, punting the ball away. On the next play, running back Tahj White ripped off a 41-yard run for a touchdown. On the Cougars' following offensive play, Tune was intercepted by Reggie Pearson Jr.

After being down 7–21 at halftime, Texas Tech scored 31 unanswered points in the 2nd half for a 38–21 victory. The Red Raiders' defense picked off Houston quarterback Clayton Tune four times, including a pick six touchdown.

Stephen F. Austin

The Red Raiders took an early 7–0 lead, but the Lumberjacks scored 13 unanswered points for a 13–7 halftime lead. Texas Tech running back Tahj Brooks scored two touchdowns in the 3rd to go up 21–13. Stephen F. Austin quickly responded, with Trae Self throwing a 4-yard touchdown pass to Ja'Bray Young in the opening seconds of the 4th quarter, but the two-point conversion to tie the game failed. The Red Raiders would respond on their next drive with a 4-yard touchdown run from Xavier White to extend their lead to 28–19. The Lumberjacks would respond with a 36-yard field goal from kicker Chris Campos to trail 22–28. Texas Tech failed to do anything on its next possession, going three-and-out and punted the ball away. Stephen F. Austin made it to the Texas Tech 7-yard line with just over a minute left in the game, but failed to convert on 4th down. The Red Raiders kneeled down twice to end the game, winning 28–22.

Texas Tech committed four turnovers in the game while Stephen F. Austin had zero. Tyler Shough threw two interceptions, including a pick six, and also lost a fumble; wide receiver McClane Mannix also lost a fumble. The Lumberjacks had possession of the ball for 40:07, going 5-of-21 on 3rd downs, 5-of-8 on 4th downs, and had 375 yards of total offense. The Red Raiders only held on to the ball for 19:53, going 5-of-10 on 3rd downs, 0-of-1 on 4th downs, and had 364 yards of total offense.

FIU

The two teams punted on their first possessions before FIU scored a touchdown on its second possession with a 3-yard run from D'vonte Price. The Panthers' following drive ended with a punt, but a miscue from the Red Raiders' special teams gave the ball back to FIU at the Texas Tech 38-yard line. On the next play, Marquise Waters intercepted a Max Bortenschlager pass and returned it 72 yards for a pick six. FIU made it to the Texas Tech 14-yard line on its next drive, helped by two defensive penalties on 3rd down, but had to settle for a field goal; however, Chase Gabriel's 32-yard attempt was no good, going wide right. Texas Tech scored its first offensive touchdown on the following drive with a 4-yard pass from Tyler Shough to tight end Travis Koontz. The Panthers would quickly respond, with Bortenschlager throwing a 69-yard touchdown pass to running back E.J. Wilson Jr. on 3rd down. The Red Raiders would go on to score 21 unanswered points to lead 35–14 at halftime.

Shough exited the game early in the 4th quarter, finishing with 399 yards (a career high) and 4 touchdowns (tying a career high) with no interceptions. He was replaced for one drive by Henry Colombi, who finished the drive with a 19-yard touchdown run. Donovan Smith would finish the game at quarterback. With the victory, Texas Tech started a season 3–0 for the first time since 2017.

at Texas

Texas Tech's defense struggled in the first half, letting the Texas offense score on five straight drives and letting the Longhorns convert on 4th down twice. In the 2nd quarter, Tyler Shough threw a pick six and was injured on the play; he finished 9-of-11 for 68 yards with a rushing touchdown and an interception. Henry Colombi would come in for the injured Shough, throwing a 40-yard touchdown pass to Myles Price on his second drive.

at West Virginia

The Red Raiders scored 17 unanswered points in the first half, with two touchdown runs from SaRodrick Thompson in the first quarter and a 33-yard field goal from Jonathan Garibay in the second right before halftime. Texas Tech's offense would struggle in the second half, being shut out completely in the third quarter while West Virginia scored 17 points to tie the game at 17–17 heading into the fourth quarter. In the fourth, the Red Raiders' defense held the Mountaineers to only a field goal. Following the field goal, the Red Raiders' offense would march down the field on a drive that lasted for over 4 minutes, ending the drive with a 32-yard field goal from Garibay with 18 seconds left. On the ensuing kickoff, Trey Wolff squibbed the ball, with Winston Wright Jr. recovering the ball and taking a knee at the West Virginia 9-yard line. Jarret Doege would throw a 29-yard pass to Isaiah Esdale then threw a pass intended for Sam James that fell incomplete as time expired, giving Texas Tech a 23–20 victory.

With the win, the Red Raiders improved to 4–1, 1–1 in conference play, and won their third straight against West Virginia.

TCU

The Texas Tech defense gave up 394 rushing yards, with TCU running backs Kendre Miller and Zach Evans both finishing with over 100 yards rushing.

at Kansas

Texas Tech held Kansas scoreless for most of the game, with the Jayhawks' first score coming with 0:52 left in the game. On the following drive, backup running back Nehemiah Martinez fumbled the ball and it was recovered by Kans Edwin White-Schultz for the Jayhawks. The fumble recovery would lead to another Kansas touchdown, with backup quarterback throwing a 13-yard pass to Lawrence Arnold with 0:10 left. Texas Tech fourth-string quarterback Behren Morton would take a knee to end the game. The Red Raiders finished the game with 438 yards of offense while the Jayhawks only had 273, with many of those yards coming against reserve players. Third string quarterback Donovan Smith saw more playing time during the game, finishing 4-of-5 for 70 yards along with 37 yards rushing and a touchdown.

Kansas State

Texas Tech scored fast.  On the second play of the game, Erik Ezukanma ran a 45-yard touchdown run.  On the ensuing kickoff, Malik Knowles fumbled and Tyrique Matthews recovered the ball at the 23-yard-line which led the Red Raiders to be up 14-0.

The Red Raiders had a 24–10 lead at halftime, but were shutout in the second half as Kansas State scored 15 unanswered points. On the following Monday, head coach Matt Wells was fired, with offensive coordinator Sonny Cumbie being named interim head coach.

at No. 4 Oklahoma

Starting quarterback Henry Colombi left the game in the second quarter after being shaken up on a tackle. He was replaced by redshirt freshman Donovan Smith for the rest of the game.

Iowa State

Redshirt freshman Donovan Smith made his first start at quarterback, with Tyler Shough still recovering from a broken collarbone and Henry Colombi out due to an illness. The Red Raiders had a 31–14 lead at halftime, but the Cyclones went on a 24–7 run in the second half to tie the game at 38–38 with a minute left in regulation. With no timeouts, Smith led the offense down to the Iowa State 44-yard line before kicker Jonathan Garibay was sent out to try the game-winning field goal with three seconds left. Garibay's kick, a 62-yard attempt, was good, giving Texas Tech a 41–38 victory to become Bowl eligible for the first time since the 2017 season; the win was also Texas Tech's first win over Iowa State since 2015. Garibay's 62-yard game-winning field goal set the record for longest field goal of the 2021 season.

No. 9 Oklahoma State

Starting quarterback Donovan Smith was pulled from the game midway through the third quarter and was replaced by Behren Morton; Smith would re-enter the game in the fourth quarter. This was the Red Raiders' first shutout loss since the 1996 Alamo Bowl.

at No. 8 Baylor

Baylor scored just over a minute into the game, with quarterback Blake Shapen throwing a 61-yard touchdown pass to running back Trestan Ebner. The Red Raiders fumbled the ball on their first offensive play, with running back SaRodrick Thompson losing the ball on a tackle and Jairon McVea recovering it at the Texas Tech 42-yard line for the Bears. Texas Tech's defense would hold Baylor to field goal on the ensuing drive, with Isaiah Hankins making a 28-yard field goal. The Red Raiders would respond on the next drive with a 46-yard field goal from Jonathan Garibay. The Red Raiders' first offensive drive of the 2nd quarter would end with another fumble, as quarterback Donovan Smith lost the ball on a sack with Raleigh Texada recovering it for the Bears. Baylor would capitalize on the turnover, with a 4-yard touchdown run from Abram Smith. Texas Tech would respond on the following drive with a 1-yard touchdown run from Tahj Brooks, the team's first touchdown of the game.

vs. Mississippi State (Liberty Bowl)

The Red Raiders finished off the season against the Mississippi State Bulldogs, led by former head coach Mike Leach, in the Liberty Bowl. Texas Tech scored on its opening drive and never trailed in the game. The Red Raiders finished the game with 512 yards of offense and committed no turnovers, while the defense held the Bulldogs to just 344 yards and forced three turnovers, including a turnover on special teams. Texas Tech  quarterback Donovan Smith was named the game's MVP.

Statistics
Scores against non-conference opponents

Scores against the Big 12

Scores against all opponents

Weekly awards
 Big 12 Defensive Player of the Week
Riko Jeffers (week 1 vs. Houston)
Colin Schooler (week 5 vs. West Virginia)

 Big 12 Special Teams Player of the Week
Jonathan Garibay (week 5 vs. West Virginia)
Jonathan Garibay (week 11 vs. Iowa State)

 Big 12 Newcomer of the Week
Reggie Pearson Jr. (week 1 vs. Houston)
Donovan Smith (week 11 vs. Iowa State)

Players drafted into the NFL

References

Texas Tech
Texas Tech Red Raiders football seasons
Liberty Bowl champion seasons
Texas Tech Red Raiders football